Andrew Rouse (born 2 December 1947) is a British racing driver, most notably in the British Saloon Car Championship. He won the BSCC in 1975, 1983, 1984 and 1985.

Andy Rouse is one of the most successful drivers ever to appear in the BSCC. His 60 overall wins in the category was the highest total by any driver for many years, until being overhauled by Jason Plato at Brands Hatch in the opening round of the 2011 season.

Early career 

Rouse was born in Dymock, Gloucestershire. Coming from an engineering background, he was originally an apprentice with an agricultural engineering company. He had been interested in motor sport from an early age and had run self-built autograss specials in his teens and then Formula Ford. In 1971 he funded his racing activities by working for Broadspeed, the race car engineering company set-up by Brummie Ralph Broad. Rouse's combined engineering and driving talent soon became apparent to Broad, who then encouraged his motorsport career by providing him with assistance to race in other championships.

His first step into saloon car racing came in 1972, when he entered the Ford Escort Mexico series. He won this one-make championship in his first year, and soon stepped up into the British Saloon Car Championship. Over the following years, Rouse was successful in a number of Broadspeed entered cars (including Ford Escorts, Triumph Dolomite Sprints and Ford Capris) winning his class in 1973, 1974 and taking the title in 1975.

In 1976, Broadspeed ran the works Jaguar XJ12C cars, for which Rouse was both driver and race development engineer. Great results were expected from these powerful cars but unfortunately British Leyland stopped the program the following season following a string of poor results. With no works deal for 1978, Ralph Broad sold his stake in the company and Broadspeed soon went into liquidation. Rouse drove alongside Gordon Spice in 1979 and 80, getting good results in the works Ford Capri team.

Andy Rouse Engineering 

In 1981, Rouse set up his own engineering company, Andy Rouse Engineering, taking many of the ex-Broadspeed employees with him. His success on the track continued with Championship wins in 1983 and 1984. His 1983 win came about after Steve Soper, driving for the works TWR Austin Rover team, had his championship win disqualified. Rouse took over the Alfa Romeo GTV6 entered by Pete Hall's Industrial Control Services (ICS) plc company, won his class and latterly the championship, and also founded the long running sponsorship deal between himself and ICS. He also won the Willhire 24 Hour in 1981 and 1983. After competing in a Rover Vitesse in 1984 and winning the title against the factory Rover team, Ford gave him the 'works' contract to build and drive their next generation touring car, the Sierra Cosworth, which was to dominate the BTCC until the end of the decade. Rouse won the championship again in 1985 driving a Sierra XR4Ti, but this was to be his last overall title. For 1987, Ford homologated the Sierra RS500, and ARE set about transforming it into a BTCC machine. The result was one of the most famous touring cars of all time. Rouse never won the title outright in an RS500,  although he won Class A again in 1988 and 1989. He was third overall in 1988, 1989 and 1990.

As a prelude to the new 2.0 litre formula for 1991, Rouse built a 2.0 Sierra Sapphire run under the Hawaiian Tropic banner, driven first by Ray Bellm and then Chris Hodgetts. The car was not very successful, but it did give useful experience for the super touring era to come. For 1991, ARE picked up the works contract to run the Toyota team. The car was a success, challenging for the 1991 title. In 1992 Rouse was joined by Will Hoy, again running the Toyota Carina, before setting up the works Ford Mondeo team for 1993, hiring Paul Radisich to drive alongside himself. The Mondeo was the class of the field in the second half of the 1993 season,  but had to give best in 1994 to Alfa Romeo. He retired from driving at the end of 1994, hiring Kelvin Burt as Paul's teammate for 1995. That year was frustrating, and Ford gave the works contract to West Surrey Racing for the following season. Rouse instead ran a semi-works Nissan team in 1996, running Gary Ayles and Owen McAuley with limited success. Rouse later built a Super Touring specification Toyota Corolla which failed to find a racing team.

Since the demise of his touring car teams, Rouse spent several years trying to promote a rival series to the BTCC; his proposed "Supercar V8" was based on a spaceframe chassis, normally aspirated V8 engine, and bodywork modelled on medium to large saloon cars. This series has not yet materialised.

Rouse has since wound down Andy Rouse Engineering and retired from motor racing. He now runs a commercial real estate business and restores Cadillac vehicles.

His son Julian is a director of the Arden International racing team.

In 2003, Andy and Julian won the 2003 Britcar season in a Mercedes 190 DTM. Julian continued to race in Britcar and even competed in the 24 Hours of Silverstone a few times.

In 2005, a poll by readers of Motorsport Magazine voted Rouse the third greatest touring car driver ever.

Racing record

Complete British Saloon / Touring Car Championship results
(key) (Races in bold indicate pole position – 1973–1990 in class) (Races in italics indicate fastest lap – 1 point awarded ?–1989 in class)

 – Race was stopped due to heavy rain. No points were awarded.

† Events with 2 races staged for the different classes.

‡ Endurance driver.

Complete 24 Hours of Spa results

Complete 24 Hours of Le Mans results

Complete World Touring Car Championship results
(key) (Races in bold indicate pole position) (Races in italics indicate fastest lap)

Complete Bathurst 1000 results

References

1947 births
Living people
British Touring Car Championship drivers
British Touring Car Championship Champions
Britcar drivers
24 Hours of Le Mans drivers
World Touring Car Championship drivers
World Sportscar Championship drivers
24 Hours of Spa drivers
People from Dymock
Australian Endurance Championship drivers
Porsche Motorsports drivers